HMS Alecto was an Alecto-class sloop designed by Sir William Symonds, Surveyor of the Navy. Originally classed as a steam vessel (SV3), her classification would be changed to a Third Class Sloop. She initially served in the Mediterranean, prior to her tug of war with the Rattler. She spent her time in the Americas and mainly on the anti-slavery patrol off the west coast of Africa. She was broken in November 1865

Alecto was the second named vessel since it was used for a 12-gun fireship, launched by King of Dover on 26 May 1781 and sold in 1802.

Construction
She was ordered on 25 February 1839 from Chatham Dockyard with her keel laid in July. She was launched about two months later on 7 September. Following her launch she was towed to Limehouse to have her boilers and machinery fitted. She returned to Chatham and was completed for sea on 12 December 1839 at a initial cost of £27,268 including the machinery cost of £10,700.

Commissioned Service

First Commission
She was commissioned on 26 October 1839 under the command of Lieutenant William Hoseason, RN for service in the Mediterranean. She returned to Home Waters at Portsmouth. In March 1845 she participated in a series of trials with her near sister the screw driven HMS Rattler. On 3 April, the first of three tug of wars took place. Alecto and Rattler were joined by a hawser stern to stern. The weather was perfectly calm. Rattlers engine developed 300 indicated horsepower where as Alectos only reached 141 IHP. The result was Rattler towed Alecto astern at 2.8 knots. She paid off at Woolwich on 24 April 1845. She was refitted and reboilered at Woolwich at a cost of £18,110 for fitting and £10,073 for boilers.

Second Commission
She commissioned on 10 November 1845 under the command of Lieutenant Francis William Austen, RN for service on the east coast of South America. Commander Vincent Amcotts Massingberd, RN took command on 17 November 1846 for the North America and West Indies Station. She returned to Home Waters paying off at Woolwich on 22 June 1849. She was re-engined at Woolwich at a cost of £10,073.

Third Commission
She was commissioned for the anti-slavery patrol of the West Coast of Africa on 27 January 1852 under the command of Commander Stephen Smith Lowther Crofton, RN. She returned and paid off on 11 May 1854. She underwent a refit at Woolwich then Deptford for a cost of £10,143.

Fourth Commission
On 2 August 1855 she commissioned under Commander Robert Philips, RN for the West Coast of Africa. Commander James Hunt, RN took command on 7 May 1856. On 27 August 1857 the slaver Eliza Jane was captured followed by the Onward on 13 September. She took Lewis McLane on 15 October followed by Clara Williams on the 26th. She took the slaver, Windward on 4 November. At the end of 1858 she returned to Home Waters paying off on 15 January 1859. She was refitted at Woolwich for £13,469 during 1859 thru 1860.

Fifth Commission
She was commissioned on 27 January 1860 under Commander James Raby, RN for continued service on the West Coast of Africa. On 15 August she captured the slaver, Constancia and another unnamed vessel on 11 July 1861. On 26 April 1861 she was in action at Porto Novo on the Niger River. She returned to Home Waters to pay off on 25 June 1862.

Sixth Commission
Her last commission was on 23 January 1863 under commander William Hans Blake, RN for service on the east coast of South America. She returned to pay off for the last time in March 1865.

Disposition
She broken in November 1865 by Henry Castle & Son at Charlton in November 1865.

Notes

Citations

References
 Lyon Winfield, The Sail & Steam Navy List, All the Ships of the Royal Navy 1815 to 1889, by David Lyon & Rif Winfield, published by Chatham Publishing, London © 2004, 
 Winfield, British Warships in the Age of Sail (1817 – 1863), by Rif Winfield, published by Seaforth Publishing, England © 2014, e, Chapter 11 Steam Paddle Vessels, Vessels acquired since November 1830, Alecto Class
 Colledge, Ships of the Royal Navy, by J.J. Colledge, revised and updated by Lt Cdr Ben Warlow and Steve Bush, published by Seaforth Publishing, Barnsley, Great Britain, © 2020, e  (EPUB)
 The New Navy List, conducted by Joseph Allen, Esq., RN, London: Parker, Furnivall, and Parker, Military Library, Whitehall, MDCCCXLVII
 The Navy List, published by His Majesty's Stationery Office, London

Paddle sloops of the Royal Navy
Sloop classes